The National Smallholders' and Civic Party, known mostly by its acronym NKPP or its shortened form National Smallholders' Party, was a short-lived agrarianist national liberal political party in Hungary, formed in December 1989, after having several members quit or expelled from the Independent Smallholders, Agrarian Workers and Civic Party (FKGP) in the previous months.

The party contested the 1990 parliamentary election, receiving only 0.2 percent of the votes and won no seats. After that majority of the party re-joined the FKGP, however the Szeged branch of the NKPP led by Zsolt Lányi remained as a separate organization. The organizing of the party was not successful. Finally, the rest of the party joined the pro-government United Smallholders' Party (EKGP) on 6 November 1993.

Election results

National Assembly

References

Sources

1989 establishments in Hungary
1993 disestablishments in Hungary
Agrarian parties in Hungary
Defunct political parties in Hungary
Political parties disestablished in 1993
Political parties established in 1989